The 2022 European Cadet Judo Championships was held at the Sport Hall Intersport in Poreč, Croatia, from 23 to 26 June 2022, with the mixed team competition taking place on the competition's last day.

Event videos
The event will air freely on the EJU YouTube channel.

Medal overview

Men

Women

Mixed

Medal table

References

External links
 

European Cadet Judo Championships
U18
European Championships, U18
Judo
Judo in Croatia
Judo
European Cadet Judo Championships